Shtamp Machine-Building Plant is a company based in Tula, Russia. It is part of Techmash (Rostec group).

Formerly a major producer of ammunition for multiple rocket launchers, the Shtamp Machine-Building Plant has converted to production of household appliances, including samovars, stoves, heaters, fire extinguishers, and washing machines.

References

External links
 Official website

Manufacturing companies of Russia
Companies based in Tula Oblast
Tecmash
Defence companies of the Soviet Union
Ministry of Machine-Building (Soviet Union)